Mark Vaughn Asper (born November 8, 1985) is a former American football Right guard. He was selected in the sixth round, 178th overall, by the Buffalo Bills in the 2012 NFL Draft. He played college football at Oregon. He also played for the Minnesota Vikings, Jacksonville Jaguars, and the New York Giants

Professional career 
Projected as a seventh round selection by Sports Illustrated, Asper was ranked as the No. 18 offensive tackle available in the 2012 NFL Draft. SI noted his "limited upside in the NFL" and labeled him "as an inexpensive utility lineman".

He was cut by the Bills on August 31, 2012, and subsequently claimed off waivers by the Minnesota Vikings on September 1, 2012.

Asper was claimed off waivers from the Vikings by the Jacksonville Jaguars on December 24, 2012. He was released by the Jaguars on August 25, 2013.

On September 1, 2013, he was signed to the practice squad of the Buffalo Bills.

On July 29, 2014 Asper was signed as a free-agent by the New York Giants. On September 22, 2014 Asper was waived off the practice squad for Eric Herman.

On December 17, 2014, he was signed by the Miami Dolphins to their practice squad.

On August 6, 2015, he signed with the New England Patriots. The Patriots released Asper on August 27, 2015.

References

External links 
 Minnesota Vikings bio
 Oregon Ducks bio

1985 births
Living people
People from Idaho Falls, Idaho
Players of American football from Idaho
American football centers
American football offensive guards
American football offensive tackles
Oregon Ducks football players
Buffalo Bills players
Minnesota Vikings players
Jacksonville Jaguars players
New York Giants players
New England Patriots players